Olędy may refer to the following places:
Olędy, Gmina Mordy in Masovian Voivodeship (east-central Poland)
Olędy, Gmina Zbuczyn in Masovian Voivodeship (east-central Poland)
Olędy, Podlaskie Voivodeship (north-east Poland)